Bonnie was an unincorporated community located in Braxton County, West Virginia, United States. At one time it had a post office.

External links 
West Virginia Place Names

References 

Unincorporated communities in West Virginia
Unincorporated communities in Braxton County, West Virginia